K. Whittelsey was a historic tugboat, last located at Kingston, Ulster County, New York. She was built in 1930, and was a 185 gross ton diesel tugboat measuring 90 feet, 6 inches, long.  She was built by Spedden Shipbuilders of Baltimore, Maryland and towed oil barges.

It was added to the National Register of Historic Places in 2002.  She was scrapped in 2008.

References

Tugboats of the United States
Ships on the National Register of Historic Places in New York (state)
1930 ships
Ulster County, New York
National Register of Historic Places in Ulster County, New York